A garden town is a small environmentally sustainable town in the garden city movement.

Garden Town may also refer to:

 Garden Town (Pakistan), a suburban part of Lahore, Pakistan

See also
 Garden City (disambiguation)
 Gardenstown, Scotland
 Garden Township (disambiguation)